The Canon de 76 FRC was a Belgian infantry support gun, produced by the Fonderie Royale des Canons (FRC). The gun was typically of 76 mm calibre; however, an optional 47 mm barrel could be fitted instead. The gun was designed for transport via a trailer towed by a vehicle. In 1940, the Wehrmacht redesignated these as 7.6 cm IG 260(b). At the start of World War II, 198 of these guns had been produced.

See also
47 mm Model 1931 anti-tank gun

References

World War II artillery of Belgium
Infantry guns
76 mm artillery